The List of Velocio–SRAM Pro Cycling riders contains riders from .

2015 Specialized-lululemon 

As of 1 January 2015. Ages as of 1 January 2015.

2014 Specialized-lululemon 

As of 1 January 2014. Ages as of 1 January 2014.

2013 Specialized-lululemon 

As of 1 January 2013. Ages as of 1 January 2013.

Source

2012 Team Specialized-lululemon 

Ages as of 1 January 2012.

Source

2011 HTC-Highroad Women

2010 Team HTC-Columbia Women 

Ages as of 1 January 2010.

Source

2009 Team Columbia-High Road Women, Team Columbia-HTC Women

Ages as of 1 January 2009.

Source

2008 Team High Road Women, Team Columbia Women 

Ages as of 1 January 2008.

Source

2007 T-Mobile Women 

Ages as of 1 January 2007.

Source

2006 T-Mobile Women 

Ages as of 1 January 2006.

Source

2005 Team T-Mobile Women 

Ages as of 1 January 2005.

2004 Team T-Mobile Women 
Ages as of 1 January 2004.

Source

2003 Team T-Mobile 
Ages as of 1 January 2003.

Source

See also

Team Specialized-lululemon
Men's team riders
List of HTC-Highroad riders

References

Team Specialized-lululemon
Velocio–SRAM Pro Cycling